Chaya Mushka (Moussia) Schneerson (March 16, 1901 – February 10, 1988), referred to by Lubavitchers as The Rebbetzin, was the wife of Menachem Mendel Schneerson, the seventh and last rebbe (spiritual leader) of the Chabad-Lubavitch branch of Hasidic Judaism. She was the second of three daughters of the sixth Lubavitcher rebbe, Yosef Yitzchok Schneersohn. She was named after the wife of the third Lubavitcher rebbe, Menachem Mendel Schneersohn.

Biography

Early life 

She was born in Babinovichi, near the city of Lubavitch on Shabbat, the 25th of Adar of the year 5661 (March 16, 1901 (NS); March 3, 1901 (OS)). At the request of her grandfather, Sholom Dovber Schneersohn, she was named Chaya Mushka after her great great grandmother, the wife of Menachem Mendel Schneersohn. She lived in Lubavitch until the autumn of 1915 when due to World War I, she and her family fled to Rostov. In 1920, on the death of her grandfather, the fifth Lubavitcher rebbe, Sholom Dovber Schneersohn, her father became the sixth rebbe of Lubavitch.

In May 1924, she moved with her family to Leningrad, where her father was forced to go after several years of being singled out for persecution by the local Jewish section of the Communist Party in Rostov. In the autumn of 1927, her father was imprisoned for disseminating Torah observance, and she participated in successful efforts to have him released. His sentence was commuted to exile, and Chaya Mushka accompanied her father to Kostroma. After his release, the Schneersohn family left the Soviet Union and moved to Riga, Latvia.

Marriage 

In 1928 she married Menachem Mendel Schneerson in Warsaw, and they went to live in Berlin, where he studied in a local university. After the Nazis came to power in 1933, they fled to Paris. When Germany invaded France in 1940 they escaped from France on the Serpa Pinto, the last passenger ship to cross the Atlantic Ocean before a U-boat blockade began. They settled in the Crown Heights section of Brooklyn, New York, where many Lubavitcher Hasidim had already settled. However, her younger sister Shaina Horenstein and Shaina's husband, Rabbi Menachem Mendel Horenstein, were trapped in Poland and murdered by the Germans at Treblinka.

In 1950 her father died and her husband was formally appointed as the seventh Lubavitcher rebbe.

In the court case over ownership of the Chabad Library, she testified saying, according to the chabad website, "My father, along with all his books, belong to the Chassidim."

Death 
She died on February 10, 1988, 22nd of Shevat, 5748.

Soon after her death, her husband founded a charitable organization, Keren Ha'Chomesh (Chomesh is an acronym of Chaya Mushka Schneerson), primarily working in women's religious, social and educational programs. A campus of the Bais Rivka girls' school ("Campus Chomesh") was also named after her.

References

Bibliography 
 The Rebbetzin Chaya Mushka Schneersohn. A Brief Biography. Merkos L'Inyonei Chinuch: New York, 1999, 2004.

External links 
 Rebbetzin Chaya Mushka Schneerson: The Life and Legacy of the Rebbe's Wife

1901 births
1988 deaths
Soviet Jews
American Hasidim
Chabad-Lubavitch Hasidim
Menachem Mendel Schneerson
Rebbetzins of Lubavitch
Schneersohn family
Yosef Yitzchak Schneersohn
Soviet expatriates in Germany
Soviet expatriates in France
Soviet emigrants to the United States